The 2013–14 Perth Glory FC W-League season was the club's sixth participation in the W-League, since the league's formation in 2008.

Season overview
Perth Glory entered the 2013–14 W-League season having finished second in the league in 2012–13 and missing out on a grand final appearance, losing a penalty shootout in the semifinals. Collette McCallum returned as captain.

Venues
The Glory were originally scheduled to host five matches at Inglewood Stadium (known at the time as Intiga Stadium) and one at Perth Oval. Their first home match, against Brisbane Roar, was moved to Percy Doyle Reserve due to the pitch at Inglewood not being up to standard. The remaining matches scheduled for Inglewood were moved to Percy Doyle Reserve.

Match results

Legend

W-League

League table

Results summary

Player details
List of squad players, including number of appearances by competition

Statistics accurate as of match played 8 February 2014.

Transfers in

Transfers out

Goal scorers

Results by round

References

External links
Official website

Perth Glory FC (A-League Women) seasons
Perth